Samuel Finley Brown Morse (July 18, 1885 – May 10, 1969) was an American environmental conservationist and the developer of Pebble Beach.  He was known as the Duke of Del Monte and ran his company from the 1919 until his death in 1969. Originally from the eastern United States, Morse moved west and fell in love with the Monterey Peninsula, eventually owning and preserving vast acreage while also developing golf courses and The Lodge at Pebble Beach.

Early life 
Samuel Finley Brown Morse was born in Newton, Massachusetts, the son of Clara Rebecca (Boit) and George Washington Morse, a soldier in the American Civil War and later a lawyer in Massachusetts. Morse's distant cousin, Samuel Morse was the inventor of the telegraph and Morse Code.  Morse attended Andover, like his father, and then Yale.  At Yale,  he was captain of the undefeated 1906 football team and member of the 1906 All-America Team.  A member of Skull and Bones and Delta Kappa Epsilon, he was voted Most Popular in the Yale University graduating class in 1907.

Although he inherited a considerable sum upon his father's death in 1905, he decided to move out west to begin working on his own after graduation.  In June 1907, Morse married Anne Thompson and moved to Visalia, California to begin working.  Initially he worked for John Hays Hammond's Mt. Whitney Power Company with the help of a Yale classmate. He then ran the Crocker Huffman ranch in Merced for W. H. Crocker  During his first years in California, he and his family visited Monterey for the first time.

Business and properties 
In 1916, Morse was made manager of the Pacific Improvement Company, in charge of liquidating many of their assets. He formed his own company,  Del Monte Properties, in 1919, in order to acquire these assets.  Funded by Herbert Fleishhacker, he bought  on the Monterey Coast including the Hotel Del Monte, Pacific Grove, Pebble Beach and the  Rancho Laureles, now the Carmel Valley Village, and the Monterey County Water Works, all for $1.34 million.  Morse planned to use this land to develop a community within the forest centered around the Del Monte Lodge, and he had many plans for the rest of the area as well.  Immediately, Morse banned needless land clearing and speculating on this forest land and set aside greenbelts to be reserved for the preservation of wildlife, prioritizing preservation of the forest, coastline and oceanfront. He set aside land for a golf course set beautifully, and now famously, along the coast, moving the planned home lots to the forest overlooking the golf course.

Morse developed and rebuilt the land and properties of the Del Monte Forest into the Del Monte Hotel and The Lodge at Pebble Beach among other buildings.  Morse can be credited with building eight golf courses including Spyglass Hill, Cypress Point, Pebble Beach and the Monterey Peninsula Country Club.
 	
Morse was able to preserve Del Monte through the Great Depression, as guest membership nearly disappeared, with smart business ventures. He sold the Monterey County Water Works and operated a sand plant, among other ventures.  Fortune magazine had an article describing the company as a "dying dream with a profitable sand business".

During World War II, he also leased the Hotel Del Monte  and land to the navy to be used as a flight school for 2000 cadets. After the war, the Navy bought the hotel to be used for the Naval Postgraduate School.

After the war, Del Monte flourished once again. The resort also reflected a sign of the times as initially African Americans and "people under the former subjection of the Ottoman Empire" were not allowed to own property within Del Monte; however this ban was lifted in the 1960s by his son-in-law Richard Osborne, president of the company.

In the late 1950s Morse proposed opening a shopping center in Monterey, which aroused much controversy and opposition from the downtown merchants.  The proposal was later approved in 1963 and the shopping center opened in 1967.

Atmosphere of Del Monte 
During the 20th century, Del Monte operated as a semi-private reserve for the rich, powerful and beautiful and hosted golfers, polo players, socialites, sports figures, celebrities and royalty.  It was considered one of the most beautiful places on the west coast.  The property was known for its parties,  alcohol (even during prohibition), and entertainment for the guests.  It was, and continues to be, a popular place for championship golf tournaments such as the US Open, regattas, dog shows, tennis tournaments, equestrian trials and the Concours d'Elegance Car Show.

Personal life 
Morse married his first wife Ann Camden Thompson on 29 June 1907 at Staatsburg-on-the-Hudson, Dutchess County, New York. They had three children and their marriage lasted until 1916. Their children, Samuel F.B. Morse Jr., John Boit Morse and Nancy Morse Borland lived in California before moving to Illinois. Morse then married Relda Ford, daughter of Tirey L. Ford in 1919, and had one daughter, Mary Morse Osborne Shaw.  After the death of Relda Ford Morse in 1951, he married his last wife, Maurine Church Dalton in 1952. Mary Morse, his daughter, became one of the nation's top amateur golfers.  She held the course record for Pebble Beach, Cypress Point, Stanford and the San Francisco Golf Club.  She died in April, 2018, at her home in Pebble Beach at the age of 97. 

Morse bought back  of land located in Carmel Valley and named it River Ranch. He used it to entertain guests staying at the Hotel Del Monte and the Lodge at Pebble Beach. Guests included Jean Harlow, Ginger Rogers, Walt Disney, and others.

Morse was well regarded by most throughout the Monterey peninsula.  His estate, hotels and golf courses were an asset to the area and effectively kept Monterey from being developed into a seaside suburb. The Political Graveyard reports that he was a delegate to the Republican National Convention in 1936 and a candidate for presidential elector on the Republican ticket in 1944. Regarded as the "Duke of Del Monte", Morse continued to live at Del Monte in Pebble Beach until his death in May 1969.

Legacy 
Morse was commonly known as "The Duke of Del Monte", the "Founder of Pebble Beach" and "Boss".  His legacy continues throughout Monterey and California as one of the first environmentalists to preserve the California coast. He was awarded an honorary doctorate from the University of California, Santa Cruz. Although his actions were often controversial, he was the most influential and significant figure in the development of the Monterey Peninsula. During his 50 years living on the Monterey Coast, his words and dreams became law.  He died in Pebble Beach in 1969, and his funeral included telegrams from President Nixon, Mrs. Ronald Reagan, and many other celebrities he hosted at Pebble Beach over the years. Today, various monuments on the Monterey Peninsula including an ecological preserve, plaques, streets and a gate to Pebble Beach bear his name.

References

Further reading

Osborne, Charles. "Boss, the story of S.F.B. Morse, founder of Pebble Beach" Lucky Valley Press publish 2018
Cerwin, Herbert. "The Duke of Del Monte." California Living Magazine. Jan 16, 1977. 
Brownfield, Mary. "Nancy Morse (Hooker Walker) Borland, Daughter of Pebble Beach Founder, Dies at 90." The Carmel Pine Cone. Vol 91, No. 22. June 4–9, 2005.
Brownfield, Mary_Daughter of P.B. Co. founder Mary Morse Shaw dies at 97_Carmel_Pine_Cone April 13-19 2018
Caen, Herb. "Poor Herbert's Almanac." The San Francisco Chronicle. August 10, 1993. 
Randall, Sharon. "How Morse Kept Empire Afloat during Depression." The Herald. May 22, 1989. 
Randal, Sharon. "Samuel F.B. Morse: His Influence endures 20 Years After Death." The Sunday Herald. May 21, 1989.
Adams, Gerald. "How One Man Made Pebble Beach." S.F. Sunday Examiner and Chronicle, California Living. Nov 14, 1965.
Germain, Anne. "As Pebble Beach Awakened." The Sunday Peninsula Herald. Sec: 2C. Oct 20, 1974. 
Durein, Ted. "S.F.B. Morse - The Man Whose Dreams Came True" Drafts. 
Mabon, Mary Frost. "Sam Morse Makes a Rarebit". Sports Illustrated. May 18, 1959.
Thorndike, Margaret. "Sam." – Draft Biography- with help from Maurine Morse
"100 Years Ago Today", blogspot.com.
"Samuel F.B. Morse Is Dead; Developer of Pebble Beach, 83" New York Times. May 11, 1969
"Guide to the Samuel F. B. (Samuel Finley Brown) Morse Papers, 1911-1969", Online Archive of California.
Castello, Michael. "Pebble Beach and Spyglass", GolfClub.com.
Pebble Beach Company History, Pebble Beach Resorts.

 

 

1885 births
1969 deaths
American environmentalists
American football fullbacks
Real estate and property developers
Yale Bulldogs football players
Sportspeople from Newton, Massachusetts
Players of American football from Massachusetts
Activists from California
California Republicans
People from Pebble Beach, California